Church Knowle is a village and civil parish on the Isle of Purbeck in the county of Dorset in the south of England.

In the 2011 census the parish—which includes the settlements of East Creech and Furzebrook to the north—had 114 households and a population of 261.

The church is named Saint Peter's Church. Church Knowle Fete is held in the grounds of the Old Rectory every August.

Pike family
Buried in the Churchyard at Church Knowle are the two brothers who brought the first steam locomotive (Primus) to Purbeck in 1866 - The Pike Brothers - John William and William Joseph Pike (Purbeck Ball Clay Merchants). They are buried together with their relatives. John is buried with his mother-in-law Charlotte Bridges Mayer, who was the daughter of William Adams of London and wife of the potter Thomas Mayer. John lived at Westport House in Wareham, now the site of the home of Purbeck District Council. William Joseph lived in North Street Wareham. William Joseph's 7-year-old son was drowned in Studland Bay and is buried alongside his father. John and William Joseph's clay merchant father - William lived nearby at Bucknowle House and it was here that the Pike Brothers were born. William Pike's father-in-law was Jacob Warburton who founded the New Hall Pottery in Staffordshire and also leased Bucknowle Farm when he retired to be close to his daughters, Ann and Catherine. Catherine had married local land owner William Voss.

Warburton Pike was born at Church Knowle and was another son of William Pike.  He was educated at University College London and went on to the Middle Temple where he was certified as a Special Pleader. In 1879 Pike published "Translations from Dante, Petrarch, Michael Angelo and Vittoria Colonna" and went on to be the first person to translate Dante's "Inferno" into English in 1881. Although he died in Highgate, he is buried alongside his family in St. Peter's graveyard.

1945 Air Disaster 
On 15 June 1945 a Royal Air Force, Consolidated Liberator C Mk IX (JT985) crashed in the village of Kingston near Church Knowle while on a flight from RAF Holmsley South to Palam, Delhi India via RAF Castel Benito, Libya. The aircraft had low fuel pressure and attempted to return to RAF Holmsley in bad weather. All 27 onboard the aircraft died in the crash.

References

External links 

  Purbeck Mineral and Mining Museum

Civil parishes in Dorset
Isle of Purbeck
Villages in Dorset
Aviation accidents and incidents locations in England
1945 disasters in the United Kingdom